The 2019 Havant Borough Council election took place on 2 May 2019 to elect members of Havant Borough Council in England. This was on the same day as other local elections.

After the election, the composition of the council was:

 Conservatives: 33
 Labour: 2
 UKIP: 2
 Liberal Democrats: 1

Results 
The Conservatives successfully defended all 11 seats up for election this year, with the Council composition remaining the same. However, the vote share for both the Conservatives and Labour fell, whilst the UKIP, Liberal Democrats, and Green vote share rose.

The table below only tallies the votes of the highest polling candidate for each party within each ward. This is known as the top candidate method and is often used for multi-member plurality elections.

Ward results

Bedhampton

Cowplain

Emsworth

Hart Plain

Hayling East

Hayling West

Purbrook

St Faiths

Stakes

Waterloo

References 

2019 English local elections
Havant Borough Council elections
2010s in Hampshire